Backwash may refer to:

Physical phenomena
 Backwash (physical phenomenon), also known as "swash", the backwards flow of air or water
 A mixture of beverage and saliva that has flowed back into a drinking vessel
 Backwash ileitis, the involvement of the terminal part of the ileum in ulcerative colitis, following the ascent of the condition from the rectum
 Backwashing (water treatment), the process of thoroughly cleaning a pool filter pump by reversing the flow of water through it with the dirt and rinse water going to waste

Arts, entertainment, and media
 Backwash (album), a retrospective compilation by the group Talulah Gosh
 "Backwash" (The Wire), a 2003 episode of the HBO television series The Wire
 Backwash squeeze, a type of squeeze play in bridge
 Backxwash, Zambian-Canadian rapper and producer

See also 
 Mouthwash